Nghiêm Xuân Tú (born 28 August 1988) is a professional Vietnamese footballer who plays as an attacking midfielder for V.League 1 club Bình Định.

Career 
Nghiêm Xuân Tú has grown up from the amateur football movement, and has participated in the Vietnam National Junior Football Championship in 2003. Then it became a phenomenon in the Hanoi. FLC Thanh Hoa is the first professional football team Xuan Tu received, right from the first professional shirt on May 12, 2013 on the Thanh Hoa Stadium. He scored a goal for the home team. 
Nghiêm Xuân Tú  received a job offer at the football team 1. FC Kaiserslautern is playing in the football tournament 2. Bundesliga (second level in Germany during July-August 2016).

References 

1988 births
Living people
Vietnamese footballers
Association football midfielders
V.League 1 players
Thanh Hóa FC players
Than Quang Ninh FC players
Haiphong FC players
Sportspeople from Hanoi
21st-century Vietnamese people